Rinat is a Tatar masculine given name. Rinat (רינת) is also a Hebrew language feminine name, and may refer to:

Rinat Abdulin, Kazakhstani football player
Rinat Akhmetov (born 1966), Ukrainian business man, multi-billionaire
Rinat Akhmetshin, Russian-American lobbyist and former Soviet counterintelligence officer
Rinat Baibekov (born 1962), Tatar-Russian artist
Rinat Brodach (born 1984), Israeli American fashion designer
Rinat Dasayev (born 1957), Russian former football goalkeeper of Tatar ethnicity
Rinat Farkhoutdinov (born 1975), Russian ice dancer who competed internationally for Japan
Rinat Gutman (born 1980), Israeli rapper, singer, and songwriter
Rinat Ibragimov (born 1986), Russian ice hockey player
Rinat Ibragimov (born 1986), Kazakhstani judoka
Rinat Kedem (born 1965), American mathematician and mathematical physicist
Rinat Mardanshin (1963–2005), Russian motorcycle speedway rider
Rinat Matatov (born 1981), Israeli actress
Rinat Shaham (born 1980), Israeli  mezzo-soprano singer
Rinat Timokhin (born 1980), Russian football player
Rinat Valiev (born 1995), ethnic Tatar-Russian hockey player in Toronto Maple Leafs organization
Rinat Vasikov (born 1971), retired Russian professional footballer

As a surname:
Avraham Rinat (born 1929), Dutch-Israeli theoretical physicist